Auckland Central may refer to the following in Auckland, New Zealand:
Auckland CBD, the central business district
The Auckland isthmus, a narrow strip of land including the Auckland CBD and surrounding suburbs
Auckland Central (New Zealand electorate), a current general electorate
Auckland City, a former local authority district that includes the central part of the Auckland metropolitan area